Any Rags? is a 1932 Pre-Code Fleischer Studios Talkartoon animated short film starring  Bimbo, and Betty Boop,  with a brief appearance by Koko the Clown.

It features the song "Any Rags?", a 1902 ragtime schottische by  Thomas S. Allen.

Synopsis
Bimbo the garbage man walks the streets asking townsfolk "Any Rags?" (during which he strips people's clothes off and takes other things that are not really garbage as trash). He comes across Betty Boop who throws her garbage to him from her window. Bimbo then auctions all the garbage he has collected from his cart to a crowd which includes Koko the Clown, who purchases a bowtie. When Bimbo opens Betty's garbage bag, Betty Boop leaps out and kisses Bimbo. The cart then rolls down the hill and turns into a home for Betty and Bimbo.

Music
In addition to "Any Rags?", the sound track includes the tunes “The New Call of the Freaks” by Luis Russell,  "99 Out of 100 Want to Be Loved" by Al Sherman & Al Lewis, and "Where Oh Where Has My Little Dog Gone?" by Septimus Winner.

See also
Talkartoon

References

External links
 Any Rags? at the Cartoon Database
 Any Rags? at IMDB
 

1932 short films
Betty Boop cartoons
1930s American animated films
American black-and-white films
Short films directed by Dave Fleischer
Fleischer Studios short films
1932 animated films
Paramount Pictures short films
Films based on songs
1930s English-language films